Serge Dedina is the current mayor of Imperial Beach, California and Executive Director of Wildcoast, a non-profit environmentalist group. A member of the Democratic Party, he was elected 18th Mayor of Imperial Beach in 2014.

Personal life
Dedina was born in 1964 in Los Angeles, California to a Jewish father and a British mother. Dedina moved to Imperial Beach in 1971 and attended elementary, middle, and high school there. Dedina went on to study at the University of California, San Diego graduating with a B.A. in political science. Dedina also has an M.S. in geography from the University of Wisconsin-Madison and a Ph.D. in geography from the University of Texas at Austin.  Dedina lives in Imperial Beach with his wife Emily and sons Daniel and Israel. Dedina is a former lifeguard and self-proclaimed avid surfer. Apart from his mayoral duties, Dedina manages Wildcoast at its Imperial Beach headquarters.

Activism
He is the former Northwest Mexico Program Manager for The Nature Conservancy's Baja California Program. In his capacity as director Dedina lobbied for the development of the San Lorenzo Marine Archipelago National Park in Baja California, Mexico.

In 1988, Dedina successfully lobbied the Mexican government for San Ignacio Lagoon, a gray whale breeding zone, to be included in the El Vizcaíno Biosphere Reserve.

Controversies
In 2005, Dedina's Wildcoast launched a media campaign starring former Playboy Playmate Dorismar in a series of provocative posters proclaiming "Sea turtle eggs DO NOT increase sexual potency!" The advertisements featured Dorismar in revealing thong underwear exposing her bare buttocks. These advertisements drew ire from women's rights groups, and several environmental groups refused to be associated with the campaign.

In 2016, Dedina issued a citywide proclamation declaring Imperial Beach to be a "Welcoming City" and directed "city departments to [...] help provide services to families legally relocating to the City of Imperial Beach." Many Imperial Beach residents interpreted the language of the proclamation as a veiled attempt at labeling Imperial Beach as a Sanctuary city. Due to a large outpouring of community outrage the Mayor was forced to rescind his proclamation after significant citizen backlash at an open city forum.

References

1964 births
Jewish mayors of places in the United States
American people of Serbian-Jewish descent
American people of English descent
Living people
American environmentalists
People from Imperial Beach, California
California Democrats
University of California, San Diego alumni
University of Wisconsin–Madison College of Letters and Science alumni
University of Texas at Austin College of Liberal Arts alumni
21st-century American politicians
Jewish American people in California politics
Activists from California
Jewish American activists
21st-century American Jews